"Ibrahima Conté" may refer to:

Footballers
Ibrahima Conté (footballer, born 1996), Guinean defender
Ibrahima Sory Conté (footballer, born 1991), Guinean midfielder
Ibrahima Conté (footballer, born 1981), Guinean football defender